Carl Adolph Grevesmühl (1744–1827) was a Swedish businessman from Stockholm. His furniture business made him a very rich man. He was commissioned by King Gustav III of Sweden to furnish Stockholm Castle. Grevesmühl owned the Zinkensdamm estate between 1790 and 1811, and in 1810, he bought Herresta.

Literature
Arne Munthe: Västra Södermalm intill mitten av 1800-talet (1959)

18th-century Swedish businesspeople
19th-century Swedish businesspeople
1744 births
1827 deaths